Lin Shoufeng (born 27 November 1971) is a Chinese weightlifter. He competed in the men's middleweight event at the 1996 Summer Olympics.

References

1971 births
Living people
Chinese male weightlifters
Olympic weightlifters of China
Weightlifters at the 1996 Summer Olympics
Place of birth missing (living people)
20th-century Chinese people